The Wordiekammen Limestone is a geologic formation in Norway. It preserves fossils dating back to the Carboniferous period.

See also

 List of fossiliferous stratigraphic units in Norway

References
 

Carboniferous System of Europe
Carboniferous Norway
Limestone formations